The 2020–21 FC Anzhi Makhachkala season was the club's second season in the Russian Professional Football League, the third tier of football in Russia, since 1996.

Season events
On 29 June, Anzhi Makhachkala were granted a licence to compete in the Russian Professional Football League for the 2020–21 season.

On 18 September, Vice President Shamil Asildarov signed a playing-contract with the club for the remainder of the season.

On 28 December, Ahmed Ismailov signed a new three-year contract with Anzhi Makhachkala.

Umar Magomedbekov, Radzhab Gusengadzhiyev, Shamil Abdurazakov and Adam Shikhanmatov all signed new 2.5-year contracts with Anzhi Makhachkala.

On 3 January, Ahmed Ismailov signed a new three-year contract with Anzhi Makhachkala. On 13 January, Alikadi Saidov signed a new two-year contract with Anzhi Makhachkala.

Squad

Out on loan

Transfers

In

Out

Friendlies

Competitions

Professional Football League

Results summary

Results by round

Results

League table

Russian Cup

Squad statistics

Appearances and goals

|-
|colspan="14"|Players away from the club on loan:
|-
|colspan="14"|Players who left Anzhi Makhachkala during the season:
|}

Goal scorers

Clean sheets

Disciplinary record

References

FC Anzhi Makhachkala seasons
Anzhi Makhachkala